Tasmania has a cool temperate climate with four distinct seasons.

Rainfall in Tasmania is highly differentiated for a relatively compact island. It follows a complicated pattern rather analogous to that found on large continents at the same latitude in the northern hemisphere.

Sunshine is also highly differentiated, with average quotients ranging from around 4 hours a day (under 1,500 hours a year) in the South West of the island, up to around 7 hours daily (2,550 hours annually) in the North East around the Launceston area. It shares a similar climate to places like the United Kingdom, New Zealand, the Pacific Northwest region of the United States, and Vancouver Island region of Canada.

Climate data

Rainfall

In most parts of the state, particularly the western portion, most rain falls during the winter months and is normally associated with frontal systems. Elevation also has an important influence on rainfall, with the mountain areas of western Tasmania receiving higher rainfall totals. It is worth noting that the eastern portion features relatively drier weather than on the west side because of the föhn wind effect created by the Central Highlands in the Great Dividing Range, thereby elevating fire danger in the region.

The wettest part of the State is the west coast, where there is a strong winter maximum in rainfall: January and February typically averages only one-third the rainfall of July and August, though even in the driest months rain usually falls on every second day and the number of rainy days per year is much greater than on any part of the Australian mainland. The eastern part of Tasmania has rainfall more evenly distributed throughout the year than in the west, and most months receive very similar averages.

Here the rainfall is evenly distributed over the year but can be very erratic as heavy rainfalls from the warm Tasman Sea are quite frequent. Whereas a three-day fall of  occurs only once every fifty years on the north coast, it occurs on average once every four or five years around Swansea and Bicheno. The east coast is sometimes called the "sun coast" because of its sunny climate.

In the south-east, including Hobart, Spring receives slightly more rainfall than Winter, and Spring also has slightly more rainy days than Winter.

Summer
On land, maximum temperatures average  to  along the coast and in the lowlands, such as around Launceston. The hottest areas of the state are in the valleys west of Hobart, where summer temperatures regularly rise above . During heatwaves, temperatures in this region can rise above .

Winter

The winter months are June, July, and August, and are generally the wettest and coolest months in the state, with most elevated areas receiving considerable snowfall. Minimum temperatures however are warmer than mainland Australia, most of coastal Tasmania rarely drops below freezing and daily temperature variation is often very narrow. Elevated, inland areas can however drop below  during clear nights between fronts, while during snowy weather the maximum temperature may not rise above .

Spring
The Spring months are September, October, and November. It is a season of frequent changes, as winter weather patterns begin to take the shape of summer patterns, although snowfall is still common in mountainous areas until October. Spring is the windiest time of the year with afternoon sea breezes starting to take effect on the coast.

Autumn 
Autumn is from March to May and is a season of transition, as summer weather patterns gradually take on the shape of winter patterns. The beginning of Autumn ( March until mid-April) tend to be warmer and sunnier than Spring, particularly in Northern Tasmania.

Locations

Hobart

Hobart has a mild temperate oceanic climate (Koppen: Cfb), with four distinct seasons. The highest temperature recorded was 41.8 °C on 4 January 2013 and the lowest was −2.8 °C on 25 June 1972. Compared to other major Australia cities Hobart has the second least daily average hours of sunshine, with 5.9 hours (Melbourne has the least).

The city rarely receives snow in winter; however, the adjacent Mount Wellington is often seen with a covering in winter, and it has received unseasonal snowfalls in all seasons, including summer. Although snow is unusual in general at sea level in Australia, Hobart has most probably had the most sea level snowfalls out of any state capital. For its latitude however, snowfall is still unusually scarce in Hobart, whereas other cities on the same latitude in the northern hemisphere (such as Boston, Detroit, Plovdiv, Bishkek and Chongjin) would generally feature snowy winters.

Launceston 

Launceston has a mild, temperate climate,
with four distinct seasons. It has an oceanic climate (Cfb) with some Mediterranean climate (Csb) tendencies according to Koppen. The city is located in the Tamar Valley and is surrounded by many large hills and mountains. With this type of topography, Launceston's weather patterns can change in a short period of time.

Ouse
Due to its inland location, Ouse has relatively warm summers and cool winters with a high diurnal range and low precipitation throughout the months. Frost is common in the winter.

Burnie
The average temperature in summer ranges from 12.5 to 21 °C with drier non-sea breeze days as warm as 27 °C, with around 16 hours of sunshine per day. In winter, temperature ranges from 6 to 13 °C, and only 8 hours of sunshine. Relative humidity averages over 60% for the year in the afternoon.

Burnie averages 994 mm of rainfall per year. Most of the rain is in the second half of the year from July to December.

Queenstown
Queenstown has a very wet climate, and is one of the wettest locations in Tasmania with an annual average rainfall of 2408.2 mm (94.8 in), spread throughout the year.

Liawenee
Owing to its high altitude location on the Central Plateau of Tasmania, Liawenee is one of the few places in Australia with a subpolar oceanic climate (Köppen Cfc).

See also
Environment of Australia

References

External links
Climate diagrams of Tasmania at WikiMedia Commons

Environment of Tasmania
Climate of Australia